The Susquehanna Valley Country Club (SVCC) is a private club offering an 18-hole golf course, pro shop, swimming pools, and clubhouse facilities to its members.  Located in Monroe Township, Snyder County, near Hummels Wharf, Pennsylvania, the club is affiliated with the PGA and the USGA. The boroughs of Selinsgrove and Shamokin Dam also lie nearby.

History
The Susquehanna Valley Country Club was founded in 1909 as the Rolling Green Country Club.  Ten years later, on July 12, 1919, the Club adopted its current name.  At this time, ground was broken for the new clubhouse.  The Club continued to expand and in 1950 added a swimming pool and nine-hole golf course.  The back nine  was then added in 1959.  A larger, second swimming pool was constructed in the 1960s.

The Course
The current course was designed and laid out by William and David Gordon in 1955.  The men's tees (white) span 5,994 yards with a rating of 70.0 and a slope of 126 while the blue tees span 6,261 yards with a rating of 71.2 and a slope of 126.  Five holes feature water hazards.

The Clubhouse
The Clubhouse offers dining services for lunch and dinner with meals being prepared by a professional chef.  Social events are also held in the Clubhouse, with facilities available for receptions and banquets.

External links
 Susquehanna Valley Country Club

Golf clubs and courses in Pennsylvania
Buildings and structures in Snyder County, Pennsylvania